The 2003 Lunar New Year Cup (aka Carlsberg Cup) was a football tournament held in Hong Kong over the first and fourth day of the Chinese New Year holiday (1 February 2003 and 4 February 2003).

Participating teams
  Denmark League XI
  Hong Kong XI (host)

Squads
Some of the players include:

Hong Kong XI
 Coach: Kwok Ka Ming

Iran
 Coach: Homayoun Shahrokhi

Denmark League XI
Coach: Morten Olsen

Uruguay
 Coach: Gustavo Ferrín

Results

Semifinals

Third place match

Final

Bracket

Scorers
 1 goal
  Thomas Schultz
  Michael Hansen
  Dejan Antonić
  Javad Nekounam
  Ali Samereh
  Julio Rodríguez
  Horacio Peralta
  Pablo Munhoz
 own goal
  Yahya Golmohammadi

Individual awards
 Best Player:  Khodadad Azizi
 Best Hong Kong XI Player:  Fan Chun Yip
 Best Goalkeeper:  Mauricio Nanni

See also
Hong Kong Football Association
Hong Kong First Division League

References
 Carlsberg Cup 2003, Rsssf.com
 烏拉圭反勝伊朗稱霸嘉士伯盃, HKFA Website 
 XXI. Carlsberg Cup Chinese New Years Tournament 2003 - Details, YANSFIELD

2003
2002–03 in Danish football
2002–03 in Hong Kong football
2002–03 in Iranian football
2003 in Uruguayan football